Streptomyces rameus is a bacterium species from the genus of Streptomyces  which has been isolated from soil in Tokyo in Japan. Streptomyces rameus produces streptomycin and endo-xylanase.

See also 
 List of Streptomyces species

References

Further reading

External links
Type strain of Streptomyces rameus at BacDive -  the Bacterial Diversity Metadatabase

rameus
Bacteria described in 1959